Rolandas Paulauskas (b. 6 August 1954 near Kretinga, Lithuania) is a politician, journalist, editor, and signatory of the 1990 Act of the Re-Establishment of the State of Lithuania.

References

1954 births
Living people
People from Kretinga District Municipality
Lithuanian politicians
Lithuanian journalists